"The Song of Australia" was written by English-born poet Caroline Carleton in 1859 for a competition sponsored by the Gawler Institute.  The music for the song was composed by the German-born Carl Linger (1810-1862), a prominent member of the Australian Forty-Eighters. It is also notable for being one of the entrants in the referendum to choose a new Australian National Anthem, where it was preferred by South Australia, but lost in the other states to "Advance Australia Fair".

Contest
On 1 October 1859, the South Australian Register announced:

Announcing the winner and the second stage of the competition:

And the announcement of the winner:

Lyrics 
This is the poem as published in The South Australian Register on 21 October 1859:

Criticism
Publication of Caroline Carleton's poem caused an immediate controversy; that it was nice poetry, but "too tame"; one regretted that nothing more inspiring than the colour of the sky and the prettiness of the scenery could be found for the poem; one wondered "how hidden wealth could gleam in the darkness" and so on, another that it could equally refer to, say, California, while another longed for a time when such a peaceful song accorded with international politics, and regretted that the contest was restricted to South Australians, that the prize was so paltry, and there was no mention of sheep.

The Advertiser of 24 October, gave a spirited defence of the judges, and of Mrs. Carleton's poem, culminating in several parodies purporting to be the "real Song of Australia".

Performances and public reaction
One of its first public performances was for a South Australian Institute soirée at White's Rooms, King William Street, on 14 December 1859 by the Adelaide Liedertafel, conducted by Herr Linger.

The song, played by orchestra and chorus under Professor Joshua Ives, was a feature of the opening ceremony of the Adelaide Jubilee International Exhibition in 1887.

The song was a particular favourite of the Australian baritone Peter Dawson. who called it "The finest national anthem ever written". His performances included notably:
Recital in London as a duet with Richard Nitschke in 1905.
Duet with Clara Serena at Wembley on (the then) Australia Day 24 July 1924.
A gramophone recording HMV EA1003 of Dawson and vocal quartet singing "Song of Australia" was released in 1932.

Proposed national anthem
In 1924, South Australian MP George Edwin Yates proposed in parliament that the song be adopted as the national anthem. He proceeded to sing the first verse, despite the objections of his fellow members.

The song was one of four included in a national plebiscite to choose Australia's national song in 1977. Nationwide it was the least popular of the four choices, but it had the distinction of being the most popular choice in South Australia. This result can be attributed to the fact of "Advance Australia Fair" being exposed to schoolchildren in the more populous States, where "The Song of Australia" was sung in schools only in South Australia and, to a lesser extent, in Western Australia and Tasmania.

The four songs in the plebiscite were "Waltzing Matilda"; the then anthem, "God Save the Queen"; the now current anthem, "Advance Australia Fair"; and "Song of Australia".

In popular culture
The song features heavily in the TV series ANZAC Girls episode 4, "Love", when the Peter Dawson record is played on a wind-up gramophone in several scenes, and in snatches sung by "Pat Dooley" (Brandon McClelland) while digging a latrine pit.

See also
"My Bougainville", the anthem of the Autonomous Region of Bougainville, sung to the tune of "The Song of Australia"

References

External links

More history of "Song of Australia"
Recording by the Royal Australian Navy Band in MP3 format

1859 songs
Australian patriotic songs
Gawler, South Australia